Patrick Philip William Braybrooke FRSL (1894–1956) was an English literary critic who largely concentrated his attention on English writers of the nineteenth and early twentieth century.

He is best remembered for his biographical study, Gilbert Keith Chesterton, which assesses the writing of Chesterton and describes his literary relationship to such writers as Dickens, Thackeray and Browning. It also offers a view of Chesterton the man. Braybrooke who was a relative of Chesterton,  met the older writer many times from his teens onwards. It is possible that Chesterton's move towards Roman Catholicism culminating in his conversion in 1922, was influential in Braybrooke's shift in interest away from his Anglican roots. Patrick was the eldest of three brothers, with Micheal Knollys the middle and Arthur Rossi the youngest. Both his father, William Alfred Rossi Braybrooke, and his brother, Arthur Rossi Braybrooke, were priests in the Church of England and he was a great great grandson of the Honourable and Reverend Francis Knollys, Vicar of Burford from 1771 to 1826. Catholic writers were a frequent subject of his writing.

Two of his biographies - The Life and Work of Lord Alfred Douglas (1931) and The Amazing Mr Noel Coward (1933) - were the first to tackle their subjects.

He was a student at King's College, London. During the First World War, he served as a Second Lieutenant in the Royal Fusiliers. He was wounded and gassed, and invalided out of the army in April 1915.

He was married three times, firstly to Lettice Marjorie Bellairs in 1921, secondly to Ida Cooper in 1929, and thirdly to Rita Ellen Constance Rivers Cripps (née Hatherell) in 1937. His son by his first marriage, Neville Braybrooke, also a writer, edited The Letters of J. R. Ackerley (1975) and wrote, with his wife June, Olivia Manning: A Life (2004).

Patrick Braybrooke was a great great grandson of the prominent sculptor John Charles Felix Rossi RA (1762–1839), whose work can be found in St Paul's Cathedral and The Royal Opera House Covent Garden.

Works
 Oddments (1921)
 Suggestive Fragments (1922)
 Gilbert Keith Chesterton (1922)
 Some Thoughts on Hilaire Belloc: Ten Studies (1923)
 John Morley (1924)
 J M Barrie: a Study in Fairies and Mortals (1924)
 Considerations on Edmund Gosse (1925)
 The Genius of Bernard Shaw (1925)
 Kipling and His Soldiers (1926)
 Novelists: We Are Seven (1926)
 Cruelty: Being the Story of a Peculiar Young Man (1926)
 The Short Story: How to Write It (1927)
 Peeps at the Mighty (1927)
 Some Goddesses of the Pen: Studies of Eight Women Authors (1927)
 The Man Who Arrived (1927)
 Thomas Hardy and His Philosophy (1928)
 Some Aspects of H G Wells (1928)
 A Chesterton Catholic Anthology (1929)
 A Child's R L Stevenson (1929)
 The Wisdom of G K Chesterton (1929)
 Great Children in Literature (1929)
 The Subtlety of George Bernard Shaw (1930)
 A Child's Charles Dickens (1930)
 Celebrities in Verse (1930)
 Oscar Wilde: A Study (1930)
 Some Catholic Novelists (1931)
 Philosophies in Modern Fiction (1931)
 The Life and Work of Lord Alfred Douglas (1931)
 The Young Folk's Sir Walter Scott (1931)
 The Robert Louis Stevenson Book (1932)
 Some Victorian and Georgian Catholics: Their Art and Outlook (1932)
 The Amazing Mr Noel Coward (1933)
 Moments With Burns, Scott and Stevenson: Selected Quotations (1933)
 I Remember G K Chesterton (1938)

References

External links 
 
 
 Patrick Braybrooke, Gilbert Keith Chesterton at Project Gutenberg.
 Patrick Braybrooke, Some Thoughts on Hilaire Belloc at Internet Archive.
 The Writers' Arms for a description of Braybrooke's life and writing.

English literary critics
1894 births
1956 deaths
Fellows of the Royal Society of Literature
Alumni of King's College London
British Army personnel of World War I
Royal Fusiliers officers
English male non-fiction writers
20th-century English male writers